Tulio Demicheli (born August 15, 1914, Buenos Aires, Argentina - d. May 25, 1992, Madrid, Spain) was an Argentine born Spanish film director, screenwriter and film producer of the classic era.

Born as Armando Bartolomé Demichelli in 1914, Demicheli initially began as a screenwriter in 1944 but by 1950 with his directorial debut in Arrabalera in 1950 he began to simultaneously direct and write for his films. He directed and wrote for some 60 films between 1944 and 1987. Overall he is best known for his work in tango film production and worked with popular actors of the period such as Tita Merello, Santiago Gómez Cou and Tito Alonso. 
 
He died on May 25, 1992 from cancer, aged 77.

Filmography

As screenwriter

  El misterio Eva Perón (1987) 
  El sexo de los ricos (1984)
  Ya nunca más (1984)
  Con el cuerpo prestado (1983) 
  Los ojos de un niño (1982)
  Alejandra, mon amour (1979)
  Siete chicas peligrosas (1979) (as Tulio de Micheli)
  Préstamela esta noche (1978) 
  Convoy Buddies (1977)
  Eva, ¿qué hace ese hombre en tu cama?  (1975)
  Simón y Mateo (1975)
  Escándalo (1974)
  También los ángeles comen judías (1973) (as Tullio De Micheli)
  Reza por tu alma... y muere (1970)
 Top Secret (1967)  (adaptation)
  Un hombre y un colt (1967)
  El halcón y la presa (1966) (uncredited)
  La mujer perdida (1966)
  Nuestro agente en Casablanca (1966)
  Misión Lisboa (1965)
  Desafío en Río Bravo (1965)
  Mi noche de bodas (1961)
  Navidades en junio (1960)
  Hay alguien detrás de la puerta (1960)
   (1959)
  Charlestón (1959)
  Las locuras de Bárbara (1959)
  El hombre que me gusta (1958)
  Ama a tu prójimo (1958)
  Una golfa (1958)
  Cuatro copas (1958)
  Desnúdate, Lucrecia (1958)

  Dios no lo quiera (1957)
  Bambalinas (1957)
  La Dulce Enemiga (1957)
  La adúltera (1956)
  Sublime melodía (1956)
  Una lección de amor (1956)
  No me olvides nunca (1956)
  La herida luminosa (1956)
  Locura pasional (1956)
  Más fuerte que el amor (1955)
  Un extraño en la escalera (1955)
  Dock Sud (1953)
  La voz de mi ciudad  (1953)
  La melodía perdida (1952)
  Vivir un instante (1951)
  La comedia inmortal (1951)
  Mi vida por la tuya (1951)
  Arrabalera (1950)
  Lejos del cielo (1950)
  Apenas un delincuente (1949)
  Con el sudor de tu frente (1949)
 Dios se lo pague (1948)
  La gata (1947)
  La secta del trébol (1947)
  El secreto de una vida (1947)
 Celos (1946)
 The Sin of Julia (1946)
  Cuando en el cielo pasen lista (1945)
 Back in the Seventies (1945)
  La amarga verdad (1945)
 24 horas en la vida de una mujer (1944)

As director 

 El misterio Eva Perón (1987) 
  El sexo de los ricos (1984)
   (1983)
  Con el cuerpo prestado (1983) 
  Los ojos de un niño (1982)
  Novia, esposa y amante  (1981)
  Ángel negro  (1980)
  La llamada del sexo  (1977) 
  Préstamela esta noche (1978) 
 Eva, ¿qué hace ese hombre en tu cama? (1975)
  Juego sucio en Panamá  (1975)
  Bienvenido, Mister Krif  (1975)
  Shoshena  (1974) 
  Ella  (1973)
 Ricco the Mean Machine (1973) 
  Uno, dos, tres... dispara otra vez (1973)
  Coartada en disco rojo  (1972) (as Tulio Demichelli)
 Reza por tu alma... y muere (1970)
  Los Monstruos del Terror (1970) (as Tulio Demichelli)
 Un hombre y un colt (1967)
  La mujer perdida (1966)
  Nuestro agente en Casablanca (1966)
  Misión Lisboa (1965)
  Desafío en Río Bravo (1965)
  La primera aventura  (1965)
 Los elegidos (1964)
 El hijo del capitán Blood (1962) (as Tullio Demicheli)
  Mi noche de bodas (1961)
  Navidades en junio (1960)
  El amor que yo te di  (1960)

  El cielo dentro de la casa  (1960)
  Hay alguien detrás de la puerta (1960)
   (1959)
  Charlestón (1959)
  Las locuras de Bárbara (1959)
  El hombre que me gusta (1958)
  Ama a tu prójimo (1958)
  Una golfa (1958)
  Préstame tu cuerpo  (1958)
  Cuatro copas (1958)
  Desnúdate, Lucrecia (1958)
  Dios no lo quiera (1957)
  Bambalinas (1957)
  Feliz año, amor mío  (1957)
  La adúltera (1956)
  Sublime melodía (1956)
  La herida luminosa (1956)
  Locura pasional (1956)
  Más fuerte que el amor (1955)
  Un extraño en la escalera (1955)
  Dock Sud (1953)
  La voz de mi ciudad  (1953)
  La melodía perdida (1952)
 Emergency Ward (Sala de guardia) (1952)
  Vivir un instante (1951)
  Arrabalera  (1950)

As producer
  Nuestro agente en Casablanca (1966)
  Misión Lisboa (1965)
  La primera aventura  (1965)
 El señor de La Salle (1964)

As editor 
  Apenas un delincuente  (1949)

As assistant director 
 Celos (1946)

External links
 

1914 births
1992 deaths
Argentine film directors
Male screenwriters
Argentine film producers
Deaths from cancer in Spain
People from Buenos Aires
Giallo film directors
20th-century Argentine screenwriters
20th-century Argentine male writers
Argentine emigrants to Spain